The 1939 Duke Blue Devils football team represented the Duke Blue Devils of Duke University during the 1939 college football season. Dutch Stanley succeeded Carl Voyles as end coach of the "Iron Dukes". Halfback George McAfee led the team in rushing, receiving, scoring, kickoff returns, punt returns, interceptions, and punting.

Schedule

References

Duke
Duke Blue Devils football seasons
Southern Conference football champion seasons
Duke Blue Devils football